John van den Berk (born 1967 in Oss) is a Dutch former professional motocross racer and riding instructor. He competed in the Motocross World Championships from 1984 to 1995. Van den Berk is notable for being a two-time FIM motocross world champion.

Biography
He was the 1987 FIM 125cc motocross world champion riding a Yamaha. The following year he moved to the 250cc class where he again won the world championship, also on a Yamaha. Currently, he is the head coach of the Royal Dutch Motorcyclist Federation, and is the organizer of various motocross training courses in Europe.

References

External links
 John van den Berk.com

1967 births
Living people
Sportspeople from Oss
Dutch motocross riders
20th-century Dutch people